Deshamanya Justice Henry Wijeyakone Thambiah (also spelt Tambiah) (1906–1997) was a Ceylonese academic, diplomat, lawyer and judge, born in Sri Lanka during British colonial rule. He was a Commissioner of Assize, High Commissioner and judge of the Supreme Courts of Ceylon and Sierra Leone.

Early life and family
Thambiah was born on 28 May 1906 in Jaffna in northern province of Ceylon. He was the son of David Thambiah, a surveyor, and Thangamma, daughter of Dr William Thillayampalam Paul and sister of Dr S. C. Paul. Both his parents died when he was child. Thambiah was educated at St. John's College, Jaffna and Jaffna Central College from where he passed the London matriculation in the first division. His ambition was to be an engineer. After school he entered University College, Colombo and graduated in 1928 with a BSc (Hons) degree in maths and physics. He taught physics for a year before becoming interest in the legal profession. He joined Ceylon Law College in 1930 and qualified as an attorney-at-law in 1933, winning a prize for coming first in the examinations. He received a LLB (Hons) degree from the University of London in 1934, coming first amongst overseas students.

Thambiah married Leela, daughter of C. D. A. Sherrard from Point Pedro. They have four children – Gulendran, Rajendran Jeyanathan, Rajeswari and Anthony Sudir.

Career
After qualifying Thambiah practised law. Thambiah also worked as a visiting lecturer University of Ceylon and Ceylon Law College and an examiner at the Council of Legal Education between 1938 and 1953. He obtained a PhD from the University of London in 1949 and in 1954 he was called to the Inner Temple. In 1956 he became a QC. He then joined the judicial service in 1956, serving as a Commissioner of Assize for five years before being appointed to the Supreme Court in 1960. He was a Supreme Court judge for twelve years.

Later life
After retiring Thambiah moved to West Africa, serving as a judge on the Supreme Court of Sierra Leone and an appeals court judge in the Gambia. He was awarded a LLD by the University of London in 1973 for his services to Sri Lankan law. He was president of the Royal Asiatic Society of Sri Lanka from 1974 to 1976. Thambiah returned to Sri Lankan in 1975 and started the Tamil section of the Law Faculty at the University of Colombo. He served as the Sri Lankan High Commissioner to Canada from September 1975 to December 1977. He then served as chair of the Law Commission.

Thambiah was awarded the Deshamanya title, the second highest civilian honour in Sri Lanka, in 1993. He died in 1997 aged 91.

Works
Thambiah wrote many books during his life:

 Dominion of Ceylon
 Landlord and Tenant in Ceylon
 Law of Insolvency
 Laws and Customs of the Tamils of Jaffna (1950, Times of Ceylon)
 Laws and Customs of the Tamils of Ceylon (1954)
 Principles of Ceylon Law
 Sinhala Laws and Customs (1968)
 The Judicature of Sri Lanka in its Historical Aspects

See also
List of Sri Lankan non-career diplomats

References

1906 births
1997 deaths
Alumni of Ceylon Law College
Alumni of Jaffna Central College
Alumni of St. John's College, Jaffna
Alumni of the Ceylon University College
Ceylonese Queen's Counsel
Deshamanya
High Commissioners of Sri Lanka to Canada
People from Jaffna
20th-century King's Counsel
Sri Lankan Tamil academics
Sri Lankan diplomats
Tamil people
Sri Lankan Tamil judges
Sri Lankan Tamil lawyers
Sri Lankan Tamil writers
Puisne Justices of the Supreme Court of Ceylon